"" ("Only he who knows yearning") is a poem by Johann Wolfgang von Goethe. The poem appears in the 11th chapter of Book Four of Goethe's novel Wilhelm Meister's Apprenticeship. In the novel, it is sung as a duet by Mignon and the harpist (Augustin) the latter being revealed as her father at the end of the novel. 

The poem has been set to music by many composers, among them Beethoven, Schubert (six settings, the last two included in Gesänge aus "Wilhelm Meister, D 877), Schumann, Wolf and Tchaikovsky (via its translation into Russian by Lev Mei). Tchaikovsky's setting is often known in English as "None but the Lonely Heart" and has been set in many vocal, choral, and instrumental arrangements.

References

Poetry by Johann Wolfgang von Goethe
1795 poems